Vicky Jeudy (born January 23, 1987) is an American actress, known for her role as Janae Watson on the Netflix comedy-drama series, Orange Is the New Black.

Early life
Jeudy was born and raised in Queens, New York. She is of Haitian descent. Jeudy graduated from St. John's Preparatory School (Queens) in Astoria and studied theatre at State University of New York at New Paltz. During her years in college, she was a top 25 Semifinalist in the Miss New York competition.

Career
Jeudy appeared in a number of short films before she landed the recurring role of Janae Watson in the Netflix comedy-drama series, Orange Is the New Black. In 2014, she made her network television debut in an episode of Law & Order: Special Victims Unit, and co-starred opposite Aunjanue Ellis in the independent film Romeo and Juliet in Harlem.

Filmography

References

External links

Living people
21st-century American actresses
Actresses from New York City
American television actresses
People from Queens, New York
State University of New York at New Paltz alumni
American people of Haitian descent
1987 births